Jaik Campbell (born 31 December 1973) is a British comedian, and an Edinburgh Festival Fringe regular since 2001 and performed his first solo show "I've Stuttered So I'll F-F-Finish" in 2005. He performs stand-up regularly in London at prestigious venues such as The Comedy Store, Banana Cabaret and Headliners, and has appeared on BBC and ITV television.
Campbell performed a new show "L-L-Lost for Words: My Life with a Stutter" at the 2007 Edinburgh Festival Fringe.

Jaik's 3rd one-man comedy show, “The Audacity Of Hopelessness” was performed at the 2008 Edinburgh Fringe.  Inspired by former President of the United States, Barack Obama's book, The Audacity Of Hope, Jaik examined various subjects and concluded how essentially nothing can be changed that easily, but understanding our own fears and improving our self-confidence certainly helps in life.

In 2016, Jaik completed a book co-written with Dale F. Williams a Professor of Communication Sciences and Disorders at Florida Atlantic University, called “Shining a Light On Stuttering: How One Man Used Comedy to Turn His Impairment Into Applause”.  The book is the story of Jaik's life from growing up, school, university and working in London, and then gaining the necessary skills to be a stand-up comedian via various London based comedy courses. What then follows is a description of Jaik's time performing comedy at the Edinburgh Fringe Festival, the London comedy circuit, and British television.

Jaik's quest to excel in these highly competitive settings was made all the more difficult by his personal battle with a lifelong stutter. By creatively balancing Jaik's inspirational story with clearly-presented and current information about stuttering, the authors provide readers with academic, diagnostic, therapeutic, and personal perspectives of this mysterious disorder. `

In a nutshell, the book is a comprehensive treatment of stuttering that both entertains and explains what stuttering is and how it impacts the lives of those who experience it.

Jaik also campaigns for maintaining UK speech and language therapy services, early intervention for children and is a strong supporter of the British Stammering Association. He now lives and works for his father's cattle feed business in rural Suffolk, in the east of England, with his partner Jennifer, their two young children, Angus and Emma, 2 cats and sixteen chickens.

Awards
 The British Stammering Association Writing Award Winner (2006)
 Hackney Empire New Act of the Year finalist (2004)
 ITV1's Stand-up Britain Finalist (2002)
 Laughing Horse New Act of The Year finalist (2002)

References

British comedians
Living people
1973 births